Muschampia gigas is a small butterfly found in the East Palearctic (East China - Amurland.) that belongs to the skippers family.

Description from Seitz

H. gigas Brem. (85 f). Upperside of the wings blackish grey. Size considerable, 48 to 50 mm. Ground of wings black. The white spots small. Female black, with the spots small and but little numerous. The hindwing black, ab. minor ab. nov. has only the size of tessellum and all the spots well developed. From Amurland.

See also
List of butterflies of Russia

References

Pyrginae